The Cotswold was a turboprop aircraft engine designed by Roy Fedden after the Second World War.

The company making it, Roy Fedden Ltd., went into liquidation in April 1947, and no engines were manufactured.

Notes

Further reading

 
 

1940s turboprop engines